Samuel Udoka Oji (9 October 1985 – 28 August 2021) was an English professional footballer who played as a centre-back.

Oji played in the Football League for Doncaster Rovers, Bristol Rovers, Leyton Orient and Hereford United, and in the Swedish Superettan for Ljungskile SK, before knee injuries kept him out of football for two years. He resumed his career with Tamworth of the Conference Premier. He then played in the League of Ireland for Limerick and Galway United and in non-league football for Worcester City and Hednesford Town. Oji joined Highgate United in 2018, and was appointed assistant manager of that club in July 2021.

Life and career
Oji was born in Westminster, London. He was a cousin of R&B/soul singer Lemar. He began his football career as a youth player at Arsenal.

Birmingham City

Oji signed a full-time contract with Birmingham City for the start of the 2004–05 season. In 2005–06 he spent six weeks on loan at Doncaster Rovers, for whom he made his debut in the Football League as a 75th-minute substitute for Ricky Ravenhill in a 1–0 away loss against Gillingham on 6 December.

On 7 February 2006 he made his only first-team appearance for Birmingham, in an FA Cup fourth round replay at home to Reading. He came on as a last-minute substitute for Stephen Clemence in a 2–1 win.

A year later he joined Bristol Rovers on a month's loan, later extended to two months. In the summer of 2007 he had a trial with Southend United, then in August signed for Leyton Orient on a month's loan, later extended to three months.

Leyton Orient
With six months remaining on his contract, Oji left Birmingham by mutual consent on 8 January 2008 and joined Leyton Orient until the end of the 2007–08 season. He was released by Orient at the end of the season.

Hereford United
Oji signed for League One club Hereford United on 7 August 2008. After five games for the club he suffered a knee injury which kept him out of training for four months; he never regained his first-team place and at the end of his short-term contract, in February 2009, he was released.

Ljungskile SK
In March 2009 Oji joined Ljungskile SK of the Superettan (Swedish second division) after a successful trial. He played only six league games for Ljungskile before leaving in June.
In August, Oji had a trial with Tranmere Rovers, but cruciate ligament injuries suffered while on trials with Turkish Süper Lig side Diyarbakirspor and with Leyton Orient kept him out of football for two years.

Tamworth
In December 2011, Oji signed for Conference Premier club Tamworth. He made his debut as a second-half substitute in the first match of 2012, a 2–2 draw at home to Alfreton Town. He was sent off for two bookable offences in a league match against Fleetwood Town on 4 February 2012.

League of Ireland
Oji signed for League of Ireland club Limerick on 26 August 2013, and made his debut for the club in a 2–0 away defeat to Sligo Rovers. In February 2015, he moved to Galway United in the same league.

Return to England
Worcester City signed Oji ahead of the opening fixture of the 2016–17 National League North season. The following summer he moved to Northern Premier League Premier Division club Hednesford Town. He made 41 appearances over the season, of which 38 were in league competition, before signing for Highgate United of the Midland League Premier Division in July 2018.

Oji was appointed assistant to Simon Johnson, new manager of Highgate United, on 20 July 2021.

Death
Oji died on 28 August 2021 at the age of 35; a day earlier, Highgate United had stated that he was "extremely ill". He was married and had two children. A fundraiser by his brother raised £12,000 to support his family.

References

External links

1985 births
2021 deaths
Footballers from Westminster
Black British sportspeople
English footballers
Association football defenders
Arsenal F.C. players
Birmingham City F.C. players
Doncaster Rovers F.C. players
Bristol Rovers F.C. players
Leyton Orient F.C. players
Hereford United F.C. players
Ljungskile SK players
Tamworth F.C. players
Limerick F.C. players
Galway United F.C. players
Worcester City F.C. players
Hednesford Town F.C. players
Highgate United F.C. players
English Football League players
National League (English football) players
Superettan players
League of Ireland players
Northern Premier League players
Midland Football League players
English expatriate footballers
Expatriate association footballers in the Republic of Ireland
Expatriate footballers in Sweden
English expatriate sportspeople in Ireland
English expatriate sportspeople in Sweden